Roberts Mūrnieks (4 July 1952 – 16 January 1991) was the first person killed by Soviet OMON during the Barricades in 1991 in Latvia. His funeral became a public protest against Soviet occupation and aggression in Latvia.

Biography 
Mūrnieks was born on 4 July 1952 in Pelši, in the Latvian Soviet Socialist Republic, which today is Latvia. He went to Preiļi № 1 High School, but after the 5th class moved with his family to Riga. In 1991 Mūrnieks was working for the Ministry of Transport as a driver, when he was shot near Vecmīlgrāvis bridge during the events of the Barricades. He died as a result of a bullet to the head on 16 January 1991, at Riga's № 1 hospital.

On 17 January the Supreme Council of the Republic of Latvia expressed condolences for Mūrnieks' death, saying it was as a result of banditry by a militia unit of the USSR Ministry of the Interior, and created a commission to organise his funeral. He was buried in Mārupe Cemetery, and his funeral became a focal point of popular protest.

Award 
In 2010, Roberts Mūrnieks was awarded the Order of Viesturs for outstanding merit in defending Latvia's independence and was recognised as Commander of the Order of Viesturs.

References 

Latvian independence activists
1952 births
1991 deaths
People from Riga